The Women's St. Nicholas round open was one of the events held in archery at the 1960 Summer Paralympics in Rome.

There were only three competitors. Ireland's Joan Horan took a 12-point lead over Australia's Daphne Ceeney to win gold, while Germany's Zander (full name not recorded) finished third to take bronze.

References 

W
Para